Batlow  is a town in the South West Slopes region of New South Wales, Australia, on the edge of the Great Dividing Range, 775 m above sea level.

Batlow is well known for its apples. About 50 growers in the district supply 1.6 million cases of apples, or 10% of the Australian apple crop, to the Australian market.  The district also produces cherries and stone fruit. The town's main landmark, the "Big Apple", which stands on private land 5 km north of the town, stands testament to the orchards which have been vital to the town's economy for over 120 years.

History 
Before European settlement the Wiradjuri people lived in the Batlow area. Hamilton Hume and William Hovell were the first Europeans to explore the area in 1824, en route to Port Phillip.

When gold was discovered in the area in 1854, a small settlement called Reedy Creek was established as a supply point and service centre for the mining area, and a Mr Batlow surveyed a townsite nearby. The gold deposits were quickly exhausted, but farmers found the area better suited to a variety of crops, so the mining supply point was moved and the current township established around 1855. Reedy Flat Post Office opened on 1 August 1873 and was renamed Batlow in 1889. Fruit trees and timber quickly became the main sources of income for the town, and in 1910 the townsite was gazetted.

In 1922, the first cool stores in New South Wales were constructed in the town. At  the same time a railway was built from nearby Tumut. These developments facilitated the town's trade with Sydney and beyond. The district supplied troops with dehydrated fruit and vegetables during World War II.
Many Land Army Girls were stationed in and around Batlow during the Second World War and a sizeable collection of memorabilia is held at the Historical Society Museum. There are two Soldier Settlements close to Batlow, Willigobung and Kunama.

On 4 January 2020 the town was damaged by fire during the 2019–20 Australian bushfire season. In the town itself at least 17 homes were destroyed, as well as the old hospital and service station. Outlying properties were also affected with hundreds of apple trees "scorched".

Population 
In the 2016 Census, there were 1,313 people in Batlow. 76.3% of people were born in Australia and 81.5% of people spoke only English at home. The most common responses for religion were No Religion 27.0%, Anglican 24.5% and Catholic 20.4%.

Climate and Geography 

The nearest city is Wagga, whilst three towns: Tumut in the northeast; Adelong in the northwest; and Tumbarumba in the southwest, are within .

The countryside around Batlow is a plateau of rolling hills, straddling  in altitude. Little or no precipitation is received from the Tasman Sea to the east, due to the large distances and the Great Dividing Range; instead, precipitation is mainly sourced from Northwest cloudbands and cold fronts originating in the west. The cold, often snowy winters, combined with the higher rainfall and good soils, make an excellent apple-growing climate. However, in 2006, Batlow experienced the most severe downturn in rainfall in New South Wales, receiving only  of rain that year.

The Bago Plateau, to the south of Batlow, has a cool and very wet climate owing to its great elevation. Snow is frequent from June to September, and often falls heavily. The region is subject to prolonged cloud cover in winter.

Present day

Batlow is an agricultural town offering services and facilities to the surrounding area, including two primary schools and a high school, a library (with telecentre), a hall and several stores and small businesses. The Batlow Fruit Co-operative, trading since 1922, (now the Batlow Fruit Co.) is based in the town.

Batlow was the home of the 'Mountain Maid' cannery until its closure in the early 2000s. The steel frame of the WWII Lend Leaseconstructed building used in the production of food for the allied troops was a landmark for many years until it was largely destroyed in the January 2020 bushfire.

Batlow's economy turns around the production of apples for the fresh food market. Some revenue is also obtained from other agricultural exploitations and timber from the large soft and hardwood plantations. There is a strong influx of seasonal labour for the harvesting of fruit from March to April. A smaller influx occurs at thinning time in December. There are a number of producers of cherries, nuts, honey and eucalyptus oil products.

Batlow is now the home to a truffery, a number of published authors, including British media personality Joshua Fox and novice film makers.

The  Bago State Forest between Batlow and Tumbarumba contains stands of alpine ash and radiata pine. Pilot Hill Arboretum (est. 1920s) and the Sugar Pine Walk- a beautiful avenue of Sugarpine resembling a cathedral.

On the third Saturday of May each year the Batlow Ciderfest is held in the main street showcasing locally and regionally produced cider and regional food. Many interesting stalls also attend the family friendly Ciderfest event. The Ciderfest recently came second in the NSW Event awards after only beginning three years ago. On the Friday preceding a Cider Industry Conference is held. In the past two years a 'Living Food conference' has also been added to the CiderFest weekend. On the third Saturday of October the Apple Blossom Festival is held. This re-invigorated festival began in 1942 and the First Apple Blossom Queen was a Land army girl.

Politics
Batlow is in the Snowy Valleys Council. Batlow was moved to the bellwether federal Division of Eden-Monaro for the 2007 federal election. With Batlow usually voting overwhelmingly conservative, the vote swung to the centre left Australian Labor Party member Mike Kelly by 26%. Batlow is now in federal seat of 
Eden-Monaro.

In popular culture 
This article was a topic of conversation in the third episode of series two of the web series "Two Of These People Are Lying" hosted by The Technical Difficulties.

See also 
 Australia's Big Things
 Batlow railway line

References

External links 

 Batlow Apples
 Picture of the Big Apple c.1986 (National Library of Australia)
 Snowy Valleys Council
 Batlow Railway Station

Towns in New South Wales
Australian soldier settlements
1855 establishments in Australia
Snowy Valleys Council
Mining towns in New South Wales